A mnemonic is a memory aide.

Mnemonic(s) may also refer to:

 Mnemonic (assembly language), an operation code mnemonic  used in assembly language programming
 Mnemonic (band), a rock band currently based in London, UK
 Mnemonic (company), a Norwegian IT security company
 Mnemonics (keyboard), the use of underlined characters in software user interfaces
 Mnemonic (play), a 1999 play created by Complicite
 "Mnemonics" (short story), a 1951 short story written by Kurt Vonnegut

See also 
 "Johnny Mnemonic", a 1981 short story by William Gibson
 Johnny Mnemonic (film), a 1995 cyberpunk film adapted from the short story